The 1946–47 Idaho Vandals men's basketball team represented the University of Idaho during the 1946–47 NCAA college basketball season. Members of the Pacific Coast Conference, the Vandals were led by second-year head coach Guy Wicks and played their home games on campus at Memorial Gymnasium in Moscow, Idaho.

Alumnus Wicks returned to the university after serving in the U.S. Navy during World War II; his first season as head coach was  Over the next four seasons, UI basketball was led by acting athletic director James "Babe" Brown, who was also the head football coach in 1945 

Idaho's sole conference victory was over Oregon State, the eventual PCC champion.

Wicks resigned as head coach (basketball and baseball) that summer and went into administration at the university;  Charles Finley, head coach at the New Mexico School of Mines, was hired as his successor for both sports.

References

External links
Sports Reference – Idaho Vandals: 1946–47 basketball season
Gem of the Mountains: 1947 University of Idaho yearbook – 1946–47 basketball season
Idaho Argonaut – student newspaper – 1947 editions

Idaho Vandals men's basketball seasons
Idaho 
Idaho
Idaho